Haplocolpodes is a genus of beetles in the family Carabidae, containing the following species:

 Haplocolpodes alluaudianus (Basilewsky, 1946)
 Haplocolpodes basilewskyanus (Jeannel, 1948)
 Haplocolpodes brachyderus (Jeannel, 1951)
 Haplocolpodes descarpentriesi (Alluaud, 1932)
 Haplocolpodes lithopius (Basilewsky, 1970)
 Haplocolpodes perrieri (Alluaud, 1899)
 Haplocolpodes renaudianus (Jeannel, 1951)
 Haplocolpodes vietteanus (Basilewsky, 1970)
 Haplocolpodes viridiaureus Basilewsky, 1985

References

Platyninae